Crassula thunbergiana is a herb in the family Crassulaceae.

It blooms between September and October producing white flowers.

It not native to Western Australia but is found in disturbed areas in the Great Southern, Wheatbelt, South West and Peel regions.

References

thunbergiana
Plants described in 1820
Flora of Western Australia
Saxifragales of Australia